Christian Nielsen (born 9 January 1974) is a Danish professional football manager. He was most recently the manager of Danish Superliga club Lyngby.

Managerial career
Nielsen worked in the youth department of Lyngby Boldklub, before moving to the youth of FC Nordsjælland on 1 January 2013. In January 2018, Nielsen returned to the youth academy Lyngby, before he became the caretaker manager for the first team in the same club in November 2018, after they had fired Mark Strudal. At that time, Lyngby was a second-tier 1st Division side, and after leading the club to promotion to the Superliga, Nielsen was appointed as the permanent new head coach.

References

External links
First-team staff at Lyngby Boldklub

1974 births
Living people
Danish football managers
Danish Superliga managers
Lyngby Boldklub managers
Danish 1st Division managers